Unreal Brands is a company that produces candy products without artificial flavors, color and other non-food additives.

History

In 2008, two teenage brothers, Nicky and Kristopher Bronner, and their father, Boston entrepreneur Michael Bronner, started working to create all-natural candy products as an alternative to artificially-flavored chocolate products available in local stores at the time.  The three tested a large number of recipes for candy, and initiated the company in 2010.

By 2013, Unreal was manufacturing and selling chocolate snacks made exclusively with non-GMO ingredients, with no partially hydrogenated oils, preservatives, artificial colorings, gluten, corn, or soy, and reduced sugar compared to similar candies of major brands.  They produced several types of chocolate peanut butter cups and candy coated chocolate gems.

After a relaunch, in March 2017, UNREAL began producing snacks with unique ingredients and creative twists, including crispy toasted quinoa and almond butter. UNREAL products are sold online and in various natural stores and conventional grocers across the United States, including Whole Foods, Sprout's Farmers Markets, Kroger, Shaw's, Market Basket, Wegman's, Big Y, and Roche Bros.
In 2015, Unreal ran a successful sales campaign in which autographs by quarterback Tom Brady were hidden in buckets of Halloween candy.

References

External links
www.getunreal.com

Confectionery companies of the United States
2010 establishments in Massachusetts
American companies established in 2010
Companies based in Boston